Giovanni Gioseffo dal Sole (10 December 1654 – 22 July 1719) was an Italian painter and engraver from Bologna, active in the late-Baroque period. Upon the death of Carlo Cignani, Gioseffo dal Sole became among the most prominent painters in Bologna, described as the Guido Moderno.

Biography
His father, Giovanni Antonio Maria, also called Mochino de` Paesi due to his ambidextrous dexterity, was a landscape painter who trained with Francesco Albani. Giovanni Gioseffo first apprenticed with Domenico Maria Canuti, and then in 1672; he entered the Roman studio of Lorenzo Pasinelli. He painted frescoes in the cupola of Santa Maria dei Poveri in Bologna, and an altarpiece of the Trinity (1700) for the Chiesa del Suffragio in Imola.  He is said to have collaborated with Giuseppe Maria Crespi.

He was one of the painters who contributed a canvas depicting the mythologic scene of Andromache weeping before Aeneas for the renowned Aenid Gallery of the Palazzo Buonaccorsi in Macerata; a decoration that employed many of the premier contemporary artists: with frescoes by Rambaldi, Dardani, and Solimena; and canvases by Garzi, Gambarini, Balestra, Lazzarini, and Franceschini.

Two paintings by Dal Sole, Diana with cupids and Ecstasy of the Magdalen are found in the Palazzo Spalletti-Trivelli in Bologna. There is a Salome with the St John the Baptist in the Fitzwilliam Museum attributed to Giovanni Gioseffo. He also frescoed the Palazzo Mansi in Lucca with a Judgement of Paris.

Among his many pupils were Felice Torelli, Lucia Casalini (Torelli's wife), Antonio Beduzzi, Francesco Monti (Bologna), Bastiano Galleoti, Gioseffo Vitali, Donato Creti, Giovanni Battista Grati (Batistino Grati), of Bologna Gioseffo and Cesare Mazzoni, Bernardino Norsini, Giacomo Pavia, Antonio Lunghi, Carlo Salis, Francesco Pavona, Dionigi Donnini (Girolamo Donini), Francesco Comi (il Fornaretto), and Jacopo Saeta. He also played some role as a mentor to a pupil of Pasinelli and Sirani (though unclear father or daughter Elisabetta), Teresa Muratori Scannabecchi, and his Giovanni Gioseffo's granddaughter Francesca Fantoni.

See also
 Lovia Casalina

References

Artnet biography from Grove encyclopedia of Art

External links

1654 births
1719 deaths
17th-century Italian painters
Italian male painters
18th-century Italian painters
Painters from Bologna
Italian Baroque painters
Fresco painters
18th-century Italian male artists